Ekaterra is a company based in Rotterdam, The Netherlands that produces tea and other herbal drinks. It was formed in 2021 as a distinct division within Unilever as part of a plan to divest the majority of its tea-making business. Unilever retained businesses in India and Indonesia, as well as its Lipton iced tea joint venture with PepsiCo. 

The private equity firm CVC Capital Partners reached an agreement in November 2021 to purchase the division for €4.5 billion. The sale was completed in July 2022.

A month after the sale, the company announced its withdrawal from the Russian market. The current situation in the country "does not allow the company to develop its business steadily", said an Ekaterra spokesman.

References

External links
 

 
2021 establishments in the Netherlands
2022 mergers and acquisitions
Corporate spin-offs
CVC Capital Partners companies
Food and drink companies established in 2021
Food and drink companies of the Netherlands
Manufacturing companies established in 2021
Manufacturing companies based in Rotterdam
Multinational companies headquartered in the Netherlands
Private equity portfolio companies
Tea companies
Former Unilever companies